Sem "Semmy" Schilt (born 27 October 1973) is a Dutch former kickboxer, Ashihara karateka and mixed martial artist. He stands 212 cm and weighs 171 kg. Schilt holds the distinction of being the only kickboxer to have won 5 major heavyweight tournaments, being a four-time K-1 World Grand Prix Champion and one time Glory Heavyweight Grand Slam Champion. He also held the K-1 Super Heavyweight Championship and the Glory Heavyweight Championship titles. He is the only fighter in K-1 history to win the world championship three times in a row, and also shares the record with Ernesto Hoost for most Grands Prix won, with four.

Schilt began his professional career in 1996 as a mixed martial artist competing in Pancrase, where he is a former Openweight King Of Pancrase. He has also competed in Pride Fighting Championship and the UFC. Schilt is one of the most decorated heavyweight kickboxers in history, having won five major tournaments. He is widely regarded as one of the division's all-time greats.

Background
Schilt began practicing Kyokushin kaikan at 8 as both of his parents were practitioners. He later switched to Ashihara kaikan at 12 and earned the rank of black belt at the age of 18.

Mixed martial arts career

Pancrase
Schilt debuted in mixed martial arts for Japanese promotion Pancrase, in which he debuted on May 16, 1996 at Pancrase: Truth 5 with an impressive rear naked choke victory over grappler Manabu Yamada.

His second match, on July 22, 1996 was against rising star Yuki Kondo at the 1996 Pancrase Neo-Blood Tournament, Round 1. Schilt would face Kondo three more times in his career. In the first of their matches, Kondo showed himself as the better wrestler, but Schilt's size enabled him to power out of his control and win some exchanges. They traded positions until the ring call at 15:00, with Kondo being declared the winner by split decision.

With a short 2–3 record, Schilt was pitted against Pancrase co-founder Masakatsu Funaki on February 22, 1997 at Pancrase: Alive 2. After circling around, Funaki scored a takedown, mounted Schilt and worked to an armbar, which Schilt had to spend a rope escape to get out from. Restarting the fight, Schilt reversed a takedown and got his own mount, but Funaki recovered guard and applied a toehold, forcing the karateka to spend another point. The two fighters then spent a few minutes clinched on a corner, until Funaki led him to the ground and locked in another toehold from half mount, making Schilt tap out.

On January 16, 1998, he fought the other co-founder of Pancrase, Minoru Suzuki at Pancrase: Advance 1. The Japanese wrestler took Schilt to the mat and kept side control for half of the match, but wasn't able to threaten him from the position aside from scarce armbar attempts, and Schilt eventually capitalized on one of them to escape. The situation repeated itself, but this time Suzuki successfully landed an armbar and Schilt barely reached the ropes to get an escape. Once standing again, however, Schilt went aggressively and landed a clean knee strike to Suzuki's chin, knocking him out for the win.

Schilt had a rematch with Masakatsu Funaki on March 18, 1998 at Pancrase: Advance 4, although he managed to take the bout to the judges, he lost on points due to spent rope escapes.

Months later, on September 14, he had his rubber match against Funaki at Pancrase: 1998 Anniversary Show. This time, the karateka showed himself capable of stopping the wrestler's takedowns, blocking the first of them with the aid of the ropes and a guillotine choke and reversing the second into Funaki's guard. After pressing for some minutes and avoiding a kneebar attempt, Schilt got the fight standing and scored a knockdown by two clinched knees. Funaki stood up and looked to continue the fight, but the Dutchman landed another knockdown, and finally finished him with a combination of knees and palm strikes.

On June 20, 1999, Schilt flew back to the Netherlands to face Gilbert Yvel in an interpromotional match. The bout was particularly intriguing because Yvel belonged to RINGS, Pancrase's rival promotion in Japan. They met under special rules, with Gilbert keeping his gloves for punching while Schilt preferred to go barehanded and use open palm strikes like it was done in Pancrase. When the match began, Schilt was knocked down by a shocking flurry of hooks from Yvel, but managed to recover before the eight count. Schilt came back and controlled Gilbert with open palms and knees to the body, but decided to take the fight to the ground, not wanting to risk another KO from the RINGS muay Thai specialist. However, Yvel was able to block all of his submission attempts on the mat, in large part due to the fast stand-ups of the format. In the second round, the RINGS fighter mounted Schilt and illegally eye-gouged him, but it wasn't called by the referee, and Schilt was left with his eye swollen shut. From that point, the two strikers exchanged hits until Yvel overpowered Schilt, landing multiple unanswered punches for the KO stoppage.

Schilt returned for another interpromotional match against RINGS on June 4, 2000, facing Yoshihisa Yamamoto. Schilt won the match in under three minutes after a striking combination.

On November 28, 1999, Schilt became the Openweight King Of Pancrase by winning against Yuki Kondo via rear naked choke at Pancrase: Breakthrough 10. He had two successful defenses against Kazuo Takahashi and Osami Shibuya before vacating it due to signing with the UFC.

Ultimate Fighting Championship
Schilt made his debut in Ultimate Fighting Championship on May 4, 2001, facing fellow Pancrase alumni Pete Williams at UFC 31. Schilt was taken down and mounted, but he used his height advantage to prevent Williams from applying ground and pound, and once they were back to standing he knocked out Williams with body kicks and punches.

His second and last appearance in the promotion would be at the next event, UFC 32, where Schilt was pitted against Josh Barnett. Schilt was taken down and mounted again, but Barnett was able to land abundant strikes, some of which were answered by Schilt, cutting both of their faces and spilling a large amount of blood on the mat. Eventually, Schilt flipped Barnett over, but Barnett locked an armbar from the guard and made Schilt tap out.

PRIDE Fighting Championships
After his UFC tenure, Schilt returned to Japan for PRIDE Fighting Championship, making his debut on September 24, 2001 at PRIDE 16. His opponent was originally Igor Vovchanchyn, but Akira Shoji volunteered to fight him after Vovchanchyn withdrew from the match due to injuries. Shoji took Schilt to the ground, but Schilt reversed him and proceeded to land heavy strikes both on the ground and standing. Schilt finished him with a combination of knee, punch and kick for the KO. Schilt followed with two easy victories over K-1 legend Masaaki Satake and professional wrestler Yoshihiro Takayama at PRIDE 17 and PRIDE 18, knocking them both out.

On June 23, 2002, Schilt faced Fedor Emelianenko, who was debuting in PRIDE after a solid career in Fighting Network RINGS at PRIDE 21. Although Schilt avoided a dangerous armbar attempt at the start of the match, Emelianenko pinned him and scored repeated punches and knees to his face until the end of the round. At the second round, Schilt managed to keep the Russian on his guard and minimize the damage of his ground and pound, but Emelianenko took over again and ended the fight punishing the dutchman with more punches on the ground. Fedor was declared the winner after 3 rounds.

Schilt tried to bounce back on November 24, 2002 against Antônio Rodrigo Nogueira at PRIDE 23. The match was originally a title bout for the Pride Heavyweight Championship, but it was changed to a non-title bout due to Schilt's loss to Emelianenko. Capitalizing on his superiority on the ground, the Brazilian pulled guard at several instances and eventually got mount. When Schilt flipped him over, Nogueira feigned an armbar from the guard and then locked in a triangle choke, making Schilt tap out in his second loss in PRIDE.

At the end of 2003, he took part in the annual event Inoki Bom-Ba-Ye for a rematch against Josh Barnett. Schilt was defeated again by armbar, this time in the third round.

Kickboxing career

K-1
On November 19, 2005 Schilt made his first appearance at the K-1 finals. Schilt beat Ray Sefo by decision in the quarter finals and the defending champion Remy Bonjasky via knockout in the semifinals. Schilt then met Glaube Feitosa in the tournament finals and won via knockout due to a knee strike to win his first K-1 World Grand Prix title.

On December 31, 2005 at K-1 PREMIUM 2005 Dynamite!!, he defeated former four time K-1 World Grand Prix champion Ernesto Hoost via TKO.

Schilt lost twice in 2006 against Peter Aerts and Choi Hong-man but still made it to the finals after beating Bjorn Bregy via knockout. He defended his title after defeating Jerome Le Banner, Ernesto Hoost and Peter Aerts all by unanimous decisions.

On April 3, 2007 he defeated Ray Sefo by second-round KO to become K-1's first Super Heavyweight Champion at K-1 World Grand Prix 2007 Yokohama.

Schilt faced and defeated the K-1 Hawaii GP Champion Mighty Mo by unanimous decision on June 23, 2007 at the K-1 Amsterdam GP, defending his Super-Heavyweight Title.

At the 2007 K-1 World Grand Prix Final Eliminations in Seoul, South Korea, Schilt faced Paul Slowinski. He won via KO in the first round from a knee strike. With the win, he qualified for the World Grand Prix Finals.

In the first round of the World Grand Prix 2007 Finals, Schilt was matched against Brazilian karateka Glaube Feitosa. Schilt survived a near knockdown from one of Glaube's famed Brazilian kicks to win by unanimous decision. This marked the third time he had defeated Feitosa in his career.

In the semi finals he met Jerome LeBanner for the second time. Schilt was put on the defensive for most of the first round. Just before time expired, Schilt landed a knee strike which badly hurt LeBanner. Before the second round started, LeBanner was noticeably limping in his corner. Early in the second round, a low kick from Schilt sent him to the canvas in obvious pain. LeBanner was able to make it back to his feet however his corner threw in the towel to avoid further injury.

The final match of the 2007 K-1 World Grand Prix was a rematch from the year before, with Schilt matched up against fellow Dutchman Peter Aerts for the third time. The match came to an abrupt end 1:49 in after Aerts injured his knee and could not continue. With the win Schilt became the third man to win the K-1 World Grand Prix three times, and the only man in history to win three consecutive Grand Prix crowns.

In September 2008, Schilt faced Peter Aerts again and lost by decision at the K-1 World Grand Prix 2008 in Seoul Final 16.

Schilt had small roles in the feature films Transporter 3 and Amsterdam Heavy.

On May 16, 2009, Schilt lost to Badr Hari via first-round KO at the Dutch Kickboxing event It's Showtime 2009 Amsterdam, in his home country of the Netherlands. The fight was for the It's Showtime Heavyweight Championship.

At the 2009 Final 16, Schilt beat the rising Romanian Daniel Ghita by unanimous decision. At the final selection he chose to fight Jerome LeBanner and went on to defeat him for the fourth time in his career in the first round via KO. In the second round he was matched against Remy Bonjasky, whom he also defeated for the third time via KO in the first round, after getting knocked down. In the finals he beat Badr Hari via KO in the first round to win his fourth GP title, also getting the record of fastest GP win with a total time over all 3 matches of 355 seconds. With the win he became the second man in history to win the K-1 WGP Title four times (Ernesto Hoost being the first).

In April 2010, he successfully made his fourth title defence against teammate Errol Zimmerman by unanimous decision at the K-1 World Grand Prix 2010 in Yokohama. At the 2010 Final 16 he beat Hesdy Gerges by a close decision, after sustaining a cut to his shin in the fight that required 4 stitches. In the semi finals of the K-1 World Grand Prix 2010 Final he was defeated for the first time in a tournament by Peter Aerts in a gruelling decision.

Glory
In 2012 Schilt returned to the ring with a more aggressive style earning a convincing victories over Brice Guidon and Errol Zimmerman.

At the sixteen-man Glory Heavyweight Grand Slam in Saitama, Japan on December 31, 2012, Schilt rematched Brice Guidon at the first stage of the tournament. He floored the Frenchman with a left jab in the opening seconds of round two before finishing him with the same technique soon after. At the quarter-final stage, he went up against Rico Verhoeven and, as he won the first of the two rounds, was given his passage to the semi-finals via unanimous decision. There, he used his eleven-inch height and twenty-seven kilogram weight advantage to outpoint Gokhan Saki to another two-round unanimous points verdict. A highly anticipated match-up with Daniel Ghiţă awaited him in the final and, after a slow start to the three-minute first round, Schilt sent the Romanian bruiser to the canvas with a left high kick. Despite Ghiţă seemingly recovering from the blow, referee Joop Ubeda controversially called a halt to the contest, giving Schilt the TKO win and the inaugural Glory Grand Slam crown.

Retirement
It was reported on 26 June 2013, that Schilt retired immediately after being instructed to do so by his medical team due to a heart condition.

Fighting style

Schilt's excellent conditioning and hulking size also lent him to attritional fighting, where he would wear his opponents down with strikes at range throughout the course of a fight. His careful, technical, style and toughness made him very difficult to knock out; he was only finished twice in his kickboxing career.

Championships and accomplishments

Kickboxing
Glory
Glory Heavyweight Championship (One time; First)
Glory 2012 Heavyweight Grand Slam Tournament Champion
K-1
K-1 Super Heavyweight Championship (One time; First; Last)
2009 K-1 World Grand Prix Champion
2007 K-1 World Grand Prix Champion
2006 K-1 World Grand Prix Champion
2005 K-1 World Grand Prix Champion
2005 K-1 World Grand Prix in Paris Champion

Mixed martial arts
Pancrase
Openweight King of Pancrase (One time)
Two successful title defenses
Fight Matrix
1999 Fighter of the Year

Karate
 2 times Daido Juku Hokutoki champion. open-weight division, 1996/1997
 2 times IBK (International Budo Kai) European Champion Full contact karate (Knockdown karate rules) 1995/1996
 3 times IBK (International Budo Kai) Dutch Champion Full contact karate (Knockdown karate rules) 1993/1994/1995
 Runner-up Open British Kyokushin Championship 1997
Black Belt Magazine
2008 Full-Contact Fighter of the Year
 In 2013 Semmy Schilt was officially inducted into the CBME's Dutch National Hall of Fame for the Martial arts.
Rank
6th dan black belt in Ashihara kaikan
Black belt in Kudo Daido-Juku

Kickboxing record

|-  style="background:#cfc;"
| 31 Dec 2012 || Win ||align=left| Daniel Ghiță || Glory 4: Tokyo – Heavyweight Grand Slam Tournament, Final || Saitama, Japan || KO (Head kick) || 1 || 2:52 || 
|-
! style=background:white colspan=9 |
|-  style="background:#cfc;"
| 31 Dec 2012 || Win ||align=left| Gökhan Saki || Glory 4: Tokyo – Heavyweight Grand Slam Tournament, Semi Finals || Saitama, Japan || Decision (unanimous) || 2 || 3:00 || 42–6–1
|-  style="background:#cfc;"
| 31 Dec 2012 || Win ||align=left| Rico Verhoeven || Glory 4: Tokyo – Heavyweight Grand Slam Tournament, Quarter Finals || Saitama, Japan || Decision (unanimous) || 2 || 2:00 || 41–6–1
|-  style="background:#cfc;"
| 31 Dec 2012 || Win ||align=left| Brice Guidon || Glory 4: Tokyo – Heavyweight Grand Slam Tournament, First Round || Saitama, Japan || KO (left jab) || 2 || 0:55 || 40–6–1
|-  style="background:#cfc;"
| 26 May 2012 || Win ||align=left| Errol Zimmerman || Glory 1: Stockholm || Stockholm, Sweden || TKO (Corner Stoppage) || 3 || 2:00 || 39-6–1
|-
! style=background:white colspan=9 |
|-  style="background:#cfc;"
| 23 Mar 2012 || Win ||align=left| Brice Guidon || United Glory 15 || Moscow, Russia || Decision (Unanimous) || 3 || 3:00 || 38–6–1
|-  style="background:#fbb;"
| 11 Dec 2010 || Loss ||align=left| Peter Aerts || K-1 World Grand Prix 2010 Final  || Tokyo, Japan || Decision (Majority) || 3 || 3:00 || 37–6–1
|-  style="background:#cfc;"
| 11 Dec 2010 || Win ||align=left| Kyotaro || K-1 World Grand Prix 2010 Final || Tokyo, Japan ||Decision (Unanimous)|| 3 || 3:00 || 37–5–1
|-  style="background:#cfc;"
| 2 Oct 2010 || Win ||align=left| Hesdy Gerges || K-1 World Grand Prix 2010 in Seoul Final 16 || Seoul, South Korea || Decision (Majority) || 3 || 3:00 || 36–5–1
|-  style="background:#cfc;"
| 3 Apr 2010 || Win ||align=left| Errol Zimmerman || K-1 World Grand Prix 2010 in Yokohama ||Yokohama, Japan || Decision (Unanimous) || 3 || 3:00 || 35–5–1
|-
! style=background:white colspan=9 |
|-  style="background:#cfc;"
| 5 Dec 2009 || Win ||align=left| Badr Hari || K-1 World Grand Prix 2009 Final || Yokohama, Japan || TKO (Ref Stop/3 Knockdowns) || 1 || 1:14 || 34–5–1
|-
! style=background:white colspan=9 |
|-  style="background:#cfc;"
|  5 Dec 2009 || Win ||align=left| Remy Bonjasky || K-1 World Grand Prix 2009 Final || Yokohama, Japan || KO (Right Low Kick) || 1 || 2:38 || 33–5–1
|-  style="background:#cfc;"
| 5 Dec 2009 || Win ||align=left| Jérôme Le Banner || K-1 World Grand Prix 2009 Final || Yokohama, Japan || KO (Left Front Kick) || 1 || 1:27 || 32–5–1
|-  style="background:#cfc;"
| 17 Oct 2009 || Win ||align=left| Alexey Ignashov || Ultimate Glory 11: A Decade of Fights || Amsterdam, Netherlands || Decision (Unanimous) || 3 || 3:00 || 31–5–1
|-  style="background:#cfc;"
| 26 Sep 2009 || Win ||align=left| Daniel Ghiţă || K-1 World Grand Prix 2009 in Seoul Final 16 || Seoul, South Korea || Decision (Unanimous) || 3 || 3:00 || 30–5–1
|-
! style=background:white colspan=9 |
|-  style="background:#fbb;"
| 16 May 2009 || Loss ||align=left| Badr Hari || It's Showtime 2009 Amsterdam || Amsterdam, Netherlands || KO (Right Cross) || 1 || 0:45 || 29–5–1
|-
! style=background:white colspan=9 |
|-  style="background:#cfc;"
| 28 Mar 2009 || Win ||align=left| Hesdy Gerges || K-1 World Grand Prix 2009 in Yokohama || Yokohama, Japan || Decision (Unanimous) || 3 || 3:00 || 29–4–1
|-  style="background:#fbb;"
| 27 Sep 2008 || Loss ||align=left| Peter Aerts || K-1 World Grand Prix 2008 in Seoul Final 16 || Seoul, South Korea || Decision (Majority) || 3 || 3:00 || 28–4–1
|-
! style=background:white colspan=9 |
|-  style="background:#cfc;"
| 29 Jun 2008 || Win ||align=left| Jérôme Le Banner || K-1 World GP 2008 in Fukuoka || Fukuoka, Japan || Decision (Majority) || 3 || 3:00 || 28–3–1
|-
! style=background:white colspan=9 |
|-  style="background:#cfc;"
| 13 Apr 2008 || Win ||align=left| Mark Hunt || K-1 World Grand Prix 2008 in Yokohama || Yokohama, Japan || TKO (Spinning Back Kick) || 1 || 3:00 || 27–3–1
|-
! style=background:white colspan=9 |
|-  style="background:#cfc;"
| 8 Dec 2007 || Win ||align=left| Peter Aerts || K-1 World Grand Prix 2007 Final || Yokohama, Japan || TKO (Leg Injury) || 1 || 1:49 || 26–3–1
|-
! style=background:white colspan=9 |
|-  style="background:#cfc;"
| 8 Dec 2007 || Win ||align=left| Jérôme Le Banner || K-1 World Grand Prix 2007 Final || Yokohama, Japan || TKO (Corner Stoppage) || 2 || 1:02 || 25–3–1
|-  style="background:#cfc;"
| 8 Dec 2007 || Win ||align=left| Glaube Feitosa || K-1 World Grand Prix 2007 Final || Yokohama, Japan || Decision (Unanimous) || 3 || 3:00 || 24–3–1
|-  style="background:#cfc;"
| 29 Sep 2007 || Win ||align=left| Paul Slowinski || K-1 World Grand Prix 2007 in Seoul Final 16 || Seoul, South Korea || KO (Knee Strike) || 1 || 2:26 || 23–3–1
|-
! style=background:white colspan=9 |
|-  style="background:#cfc;"
| 23 Jun 2007 || Win ||align=left| Mighty Mo || K-1 World Grand Prix 2007 in Amsterdam || Amsterdam, Netherlands || Decision (Unanimous) || 3 || 3:00 || 22–3–1
|-
! style=background:white colspan=9 |
|-  style="background:#cfc;"
| 4 Mar 2007 || Win ||align=left| Ray Sefo || K-1 World Grand Prix 2007 in Yokohama || Osaka, Japan || KO (Punch) || 2 || 0:26 || 21–3–1
|-
! style=background:white colspan=9 |
|-  style="background:#cfc;"
| 31 Dec 2006 || Win ||align=left| Peter Graham || K-1 PREMIUM 2006 Dynamite!! || Osaka, Japan || Decision (Unanimous) || 5 || 3:00 || 20–3–1
|-  style="background:#cfc;"
| 2 Dec 2006 || Win ||align=left| Peter Aerts || K-1 World Grand Prix 2006 in Tokyo Final || Tokyo, Japan || Decision (Unanimous) || 3 || 3:00 || 19–3–1
|-
! style=background:white colspan=9 |
|-  style="background:#cfc;"
| 2 Dec 2006 || Win ||align=left| Ernesto Hoost || K-1 World Grand Prix 2006 in Tokyo Final || Tokyo, Japan || Decision (Unanimous) || 3 || 3:00 || 18–3–1
|-  style="background:#cfc;"
| 2 Dec 2006 || Win ||align=left| Jérôme Le Banner || K-1 World Grand Prix 2006 in Tokyo Final || Tokyo, Japan || Decision (Unanimous) || 3 || 3:00 || 17–3–1
|-  style="background:#cfc;"
| 30 Sep 2006 || Win ||align=left| Bjorn Bregy || K-1 World Grand Prix 2006 in Osaka Opening Round || Osaka, Japan || KO (Left Punch) || 1 || 2:21 || 16–3–1
|-
! style=background:white colspan=9 |
|-  style="background:#fbb;"
| 3 Jun 2006 || Loss ||align=left| Choi Hong-man || K-1 World Grand Prix 2006 in Seoul || Seoul, South Korea || Decision (Split) || 3 || 3:00 || 15–3–1
|-  style="background:#cfc;"
| 13 May 2006 || Win ||align=left| Lloyd van Dams || K-1 World Grand Prix 2006 in Amsterdam || Amsterdam, Netherlands || Decision (Unanimous) || 3 || 3:00 || 15–2–1
|-  style="background:#cfc;"
| 29 Apr 2006 || Win ||align=left| Musashi || K-1 World Grand Prix 2006 in Las Vegas || Las Vegas, Nevada, United States || Decision (Unanimous) || 3 || 3:00 || 14–2–1
|-  style="background:#fbb;"
| 5 Mar 2006 || Loss ||align=left| Peter Aerts || K-1 World Grand Prix 2006 in Auckland || Auckland, New Zealand || Decision (Majority) || 3 || 3:00 || 13–2–1
|-  style="background:#cfc;"
| 31 Dec 2005 || Win ||align=left| Ernesto Hoost || K-1 PREMIUM 2005 Dynamite!! || Osaka, Japan || TKO (Referee Stoppage) || 2 || 0:41 || 13–1–1
|-  style="background:#cfc;"
| 19 Nov 2005 || Win ||align=left| Glaube Feitosa || K-1 World Grand Prix 2005 in Tokyo Final || Tokyo, Japan || KO (Knee Strike) || 1 || 0:48 || 12–1–1
|-
! style=background:white colspan=9 |
|-  style="background:#cfc;"
| 19 Nov 2005 || Win ||align=left| Remy Bonjasky || K-1 World Grand Prix 2005 in Tokyo Final || Tokyo, Japan || KO (Knee Strike) || 1 || 2:58 || 11–1–1
|-  style="background:#cfc;"
| 19 Nov 2005 || Win ||align=left| Ray Sefo || K-1 World Grand Prix 2005 in Tokyo Final || Tokyo, Japan || Decision (Unanimous) || 3 || 3:00 || 10–1–1
|-  style="background:#cfc;"
| 23 Sep 2005 || Win ||align=left| Glaube Feitosa || K-1 World Grand Prix 2005 in Osaka - Final Elimination || Osaka, Japan || Decision (Unanimous) || 3 || 3:00 || 9–1–1
|-
! style=background:white colspan=9 |
|-  style="background:#cfc;"
| 27 May 2005 || Win ||align=left| Naoufal Benazzouz || K-1 World Grand Prix 2005 in Paris || Paris, France || KO (Right Punch) || 2 || 2:32 || 8–1–1
|-
! style=background:white colspan=9 |
|-  style="background:#cfc;"
| 27 May 2005 || Win ||align=left| Freddy Kemayo || K-1 World Grand Prix 2005 in Paris || Paris, France || TKO (Right Kicks) || 3 || 1:19 || 7–1–1
|-  style="background:#cfc;"
| 27 May 2005 || Win ||align=left| Petr Vondracek || K-1 World Grand Prix 2005 in Paris || Paris, France || KO || 2 || 2:42 || 6–1–1
|-  style="background:#cfc;"
| 19 Mar 2005 || Win ||align=left| Montanha Silva || K-1 World Grand Prix 2005 in Seoul || Seoul, South Korea || KO (Right Low Kick) || 1 || 1:22 || 5–1–1
|-  style="background:#cfc;"
| 6 Nov 2004 || Win ||align=left| Jan Nortje || Titans 1st || Kitakyushu, Japan || TKO || 2 || 0:57 || 4–1–1
|-  style="background:#fbb;"
| 20 May 2004 || Loss ||align=left| Alexey Ignashov || It's Showtime 2004 Amsterdam || Amsterdam, Netherlands || KO (Left Knee Strike) || 1 || 1:20 || 3–1–1
|-  style="background:#cfc;"
| 13 Jul 2003 || Win ||align=left| Remy Bonjasky || K-1 World Grand Prix 2003 in Fukuoka || Saitama, Japan || Decision (Unanimous) || 5 || 3:00 || 3–0–1
|-  style="background:#cfc;"
| 5 Oct 2002 || Win ||align=left| Michael McDonald || K-1 World Grand Prix 2002 Final Elimination || Fukuoka, Japan || Decision (Unanimous) || 3 || 3:00 || 2–0–1
|-  style="background:#c5d2ea;"
| 28 Aug 2002 || Draw ||align=left| Ernesto Hoost || Pride Shockwave || Tokyo, Japan || Decision Draw || 5 || 3:00 || 1–0–1
|-  style="background:#cfc;"
| 21 Apr 2002 || Win ||align=left| Musashi || K-1 Burning 2002 || Hiroshima, Japan || Decision (Split) || 3 || 3:00 || 1–0–0
|-
| colspan=9 | Legend:

Mixed martial arts record

|-
| Win
| align=center| 26–14–1
| Mighty Mo
| Submission (triangle choke)
| Fields Dynamite!! 2008
| 
| align=center| 1
| align=center| 5:17
| Saitama, Saitama, Japan
|
|-
| Win
| align=center| 25–14–1
| Nandor Guelmino
| TKO (punches)
| LOTR: Schilt vs. Guelmino
| 
| align=center| 1
| align=center| 4:20
| Belgrade, Serbia
|
|-
| Win
| align=center| 24–14–1
| Min-Soo Kim
| Submission (triangle choke)
| Hero's 6
| 
| align=center| 1
| align=center| 4:47
| Tokyo, Japan
|
|-
| Loss
| align=center| 23–14–1
| Sergei Kharitonov
| TKO (punches)
| PRIDE Critical Countdown 2004
| 
| align=center| 1
| align=center| 9:19
| Kobe, Japan
| 
|-
| Win
| align=center| 23–13–1
| Gan McGee
| Submission (armbar)
| PRIDE Total Elimination 2004
| 
| align=center| 1
| align=center| 5:02
| Saitama, Saitama, Japan
| 
|-
| Loss
| align=center| 22–13–1
| Josh Barnett
| Submission (armbar)
| Inoki Bom-Ba-Ye 2003
| 
| align=center| 3
| align=center| 4:48
| Kobe, Japan
| 
|-
| Loss
| align=center| 22–12–1
| Antônio Rodrigo Nogueira
| Submission (triangle choke)
| PRIDE 23
| 
| align=center| 1
| align=center| 6:36
| Tokyo, Japan
|
|-
| Loss
| align=center| 22–11–1
| Fedor Emelianenko
| Decision (unanimous)
| PRIDE 21
| 
| align=center| 3
| align=center| 5:00
| Saitama, Saitama, Japan
|
|-
| Win
| align=center| 22–10–1
| Yoshihiro Takayama
| KO (punches)
| PRIDE 18
| 
| align=center| 1
| align=center| 3:09
| Fukuoka Prefecture, Japan
|
|-
| Win
| align=center| 21–10–1
| Masaaki Satake
| TKO (front kick and punches)
| PRIDE 17
| 
| align=center| 1
| align=center| 2:18
| Tokyo, Japan
|
|-
| Win
| align=center| 20–10–1
| Akira Shoji
| KO (soccer kick)
| PRIDE 16
| 
| align=center| 1
| align=center| 8:19
| Osaka, Japan
|
|-
| Loss
| align=center| 
| Josh Barnett
| Submission (armbar)
| UFC 32
| 
| align=center| 1
| align=center| 4:21
| East Rutherford, New Jersey, United States
|
|-
| Win
| align=center| 19–9–1
| Pete Williams
| TKO (body kick and punches)
| UFC 31
| 
| align=center| 2
| align=center| 1:26
| Atlantic City, New Jersey, United States
|
|-
| Draw
| align=center| 18–9–1
| Aleksey Medvedev
| Draw
| 2H2H II Simply The Best
| 
| align=center| 2
| align=center| 10:00
| Rotterdam, Netherlands
|
|-
| Win
| align=center| 18–9
| Bob Schrijber
| Technical Submission (guillotine choke)
| It's Showtime – Exclusive
| 
| align=center| 2
| align=center| 1:00
| Haarlem, Netherlands
|
|-
| Win
| align=center| 17–9
| Osami Shibuya
| TKO (punches)
| Pancrase – 2000 Anniversary Show
| 
| align=center| 1
| align=center| 8:55
| Yokohama, Japan
| 
|-
| Win
| align=center| 16–9
| Yoshihisa Yamamoto
| KO (knee and punch)
| Rings Holland: Di Capo Di Tutti Capi
| 
| align=center| 1
| align=center| 2:54
| Utrecht, Netherlands
|
|-
| Win
| align=center| 15–9
| Kazuo Takahashi
| TKO (punches)
| Pancrase – Trans 3
| 
| align=center| 1
| align=center| 7:30
| Yokohama, Japan
| 
|-
| Win
| align=center| 14–9
| Yuki Kondo
| Submission (rear-naked choke)
| Pancrase – Breakthrough 10
| 
| align=center| 1
| align=center| 2:28
| Osaka, Japan
| 
|-
| Win
| align=center| 13–9
| Ikuhisa Minowa
| Decision (unanimous)
| Pancrase – 1999 Anniversary Show
| 
| align=center| 1
| align=center| 15:00
| Tokyo, Japan
|
|-
| Win
| align=center| 12–9
| Katsuomi Inagaki
| KO (knee)
| Pancrase – Breakthrough 8
| 
| align=center| 1
| align=center| 8:23
| Sendai, Japan
|
|-
| Win
| align=center| 11–9
| Osami Shibuya
| Submission (rear-naked choke)
| Pancrase – Breakthrough 7
| 
| align=center| 1
| align=center| 12:06
| Tokyo, Japan
|
|-
| Loss
| align=center| 10–9
| Gilbert Yvel
| KO (punches)
| Rings Holland: The Kings of the Magic Ring
| 
| align=center| 2
| align=center| 4:45
| Utrecht, Netherlands
|
|-
| Loss
| align=center| 10–8
| Yuki Kondo
| Decision (lost points)
| Pancrase: Breakthrough 4
| 
| align=center| 1
| align=center| 20:00
| Yokohama, Japan
|
|-
| Win
| align=center| 10–7
| Takafumi Ito
| Submission (choke)
| Pancrase: Breakthrough 3
| 
| align=center| 1
| align=center| 1:45
| Tokyo, Japan
|
|-
| Win
| align=center| 9–7
| Masakatsu Funaki
| KO (body punch)
| Pancrase – 1998 Anniversary Show
| 
| align=center| 1
| align=center| 7:13
| Tokyo, Japan
|
|-
| Win
| align=center| 8–7
| Guy Mezger
| TKO (palm strikes)
| Pancrase – Advance 8
| 
| align=center| 1
| align=center| 13:15
| Tokyo, Japan
|
|-
| Win
| align=center| 7–7
| Kazuo Takahashi
| KO (strikes)
| Pancrase – Advance 6
| 
| align=center| 1
| align=center| 5:44
| Yokohama, Japan
|
|-
| Win
| align=center| 6–7
| Jason Godsey
| TKO (cut)
| Pancrase – Advance 5
| 
| align=center| 1
| align=center| 1:47
| Yokohama, Japan
|
|-
| Loss
| align=center| 5–7
| Masakatsu Funaki
| Decision (lost points)
| Pancrase – Advance 4
| 
| align=center| 1
| align=center| 15:00
| Tokyo, Japan
|
|-
| Loss
| align=center| 5–6
| Satoshi Hasegawa
| Submission (ankle lock)
| Pancrase – Advance 2
| 
| align=center| 1
| align=center| 3:56
| Kobe, Japan
|
|-
| Win
| align=center| 5–5
| Minoru Suzuki
| KO (knee)
| Pancrase – Advance 1
| 
| align=center| 1
| align=center| 9:52
| Tokyo, Japan
|
|-
| Loss
| align=center| 4–5
| Yuki Kondo
| Decision (unanimous)
| Pancrase: Alive 7
| 
| align=center| 1
| align=center| 20:00
| Fukuoka Prefecture, Japan
|
|-
| Win
| align=center| 4–4
| Takaku Fuke
| Submission (rear-naked choke)
| Pancrase: Alive 5
| 
| align=center| 1
| align=center| 8:59
| Kobe, Japan
|
|-
| Win
| align=center| 3–4
| Kazuo Takahashi
| TKO (palm strikes)
| Pancrase: Alive 3
| 
| align=center| 1
| align=center| 7:00
| Nagoya, Japan
|
|-
| Loss
| align=center| 2–4
| Masakatsu Funaki
| Submission (toe hold)
| Pancrase: Alive 2
| 
| align=center| 1
| align=center| 5:47
| Chiba, Japan
|
|-
| Loss
| align=center| 2–3
| Guy Mezger
| Decision (lost points)
| Pancrase: Alive 1
| 
| align=center| 1
| align=center| 20:00
| Tokyo, Japan
|
|-
| Win
| align=center| 2–2
| Osami Shibuya
| Decision (majority)
| Pancrase – Truth 10
| 
| align=center| 1
| align=center| 10:00
| Tokyo, Japan
|
|-
| Loss
| align=center| 1–2
| Ryushi Yanagisawa
| Submission (ankle lock)
| Pancrase – Truth 7
| 
| align=center| 1
| align=center| 0:51
| Nagoya, Japan
|
|-
| Loss
| align=center| 1–1
| Yuki Kondo
| Decision (split)
| Pancrase – 1996 Neo-Blood Tournament, Round 1
| 
| align=center| 1
| align=center| 10:00
| Tokyo, Japan
|
|-
| Win
| align=center| 1–0
| Manabu Yamada
| Submission (rear-naked choke)
| Pancrase – Truth 5
| 
| align=center| 1
| align=center| 5:44
| Tokyo, Japan
|

Acting

References

External links
 Official website
 at Glory

1973 births
Living people
Dutch male kickboxers
Heavyweight kickboxers
Dutch male mixed martial artists
Heavyweight mixed martial artists
Super heavyweight mixed martial artists
Mixed martial artists utilizing Kyokushin kaikan
Mixed martial artists utilizing Ashihara kaikan
Mixed martial artists utilizing kūdō
Mixed martial artists utilizing kickboxing
Dutch male karateka
Sportspeople from Rotterdam
Ultimate Fighting Championship male fighters